National Highway 754, commonly referred to as NH 754 is a national highway in  India. It is a spur road of National Highway 54. NH-754 traverses the state of Punjab in India.

Route 
Bathinda - Muktsar - Jalalabad.

Junctions  

  Terminal near Bathinda.
  near Muktsar.

See also 

 List of National Highways in India
 List of National Highways in India by state

References

External links 

 NH 754 on OpenStreetMap

National highways in India
National Highways in Punjab, India